Geoffrey Lord (born 17 February 1921, date of death unknown) was a Guyanese cricketer. He played in one first-class match for British Guiana in 1944/45.

See also
 List of Guyanese representative cricketers

References

External links
 

1921 births
Year of death missing
Guyanese cricketers
Guyana cricketers